Ignatius Annor is a Ghanaian journalist who works for the VOA News English to Africa Service. Ignatius has previously worked for Metro TV (Ghana) in Accra and then African news a Pan African channel based in Pointe-Noire in Republic of the Congo. Ignatius came out as gay live on the Joy news channel evening program PM Express in Ghana in February 22, 2021.

Early life and education
He started his journalism career with Metro TV (Ghana) before leaving to do his master's in international journalism at the Swansea University.

Ignatius Currently works as a multimedia journalist for the VOA News English to Africa Service.

References

Living people
21st-century LGBT people
Ghanaian LGBT people
Ghanaian television journalists
Year of birth missing (living people)